Dissolve is the debut studio album by English electronic musician Tusks. It was released on 13 October 2017 through One Little Indian Records.

Track listing

References

2017 debut albums
One Little Independent Records albums